Gustaf Munch-Petersen (February 18, 1912 – April 2, 1938) was a Danish writer and painter. He wrote surreal prose poems, considered groundbreaking in his time, which have inspired later writers.

Biography
He graduated from gymnasium in 1930 and thereafter started several academic courses, but none could capture his interest for more than a short period of time.
Instead he focused on art while being supported financially by his parents. He made his debut as a writer with "" (1932). His art was displayed at different exhibitions in 1932. In 1935 he moved to the Danish island of Bornholm, where he married Elisabeth "Lisbeth" Accheleie Bruhn (Lisbeth Hjort) (1908–1997). In 1937 he joined the International Brigades and fought in the Spanish Civil War, where he died the next year.

References

Other sources
 Svend Dahl; Poul Engelstoft: Dansk skønlitterært forfatterleksikon 1900–1950, vol. 2, (Copenhagen: Grønholt Pedersen, 1959-64)

Danish male writers
20th-century Danish painters
1912 births
1938 deaths
International Brigades personnel
Military personnel killed in the Spanish Civil War